Bielefelder Alm is a football stadium in Bielefeld, Germany. The stadium, which has a capacity of 26 515, is owned by the football club DSC Arminia Bielefeld and mostly used for the club's matches. Formerly named Stadion Alm , it is currently known as SchücoArena  due to a sponsorship deal with the Bielefeld-based window and solar panel manufacturers.

History
The football ground was opened in 1926, with land acquired from a farmer named Lohmann. The stadium got its former name (Alm) because it did not look like a football stadium in the first years and so one of Arminia's members said that just a few cows were missing in order to look like an Alm. In 1957, it got its grass cover and the first grandstands were constructed.

Until 1971 the stands were all terraced, but with Arminia Bielefeld winning promotion to the Bundesliga, the first stand with seating was constructed. By 1978 3 new stands had been built and the stadium's capacity was 34,222. By 1985 serious structural problems had reduced the capacity to 18,500, and later to 15,000.

Rebuilding

In 1996 rebuilding work began, first the North Stand was rebuilt and then the West Stand, bringing capacity to 22,512.  In 1999 the South Stand was rebuilt increasing capacity to 26,601, and in June 2007 the capacity reached 28,008 following completion of the East Stand. The East Stand features a state-of-the-art glass roof that contains photo voltaic elements built into the glass (as opposed to mounted on it) that generate electricity for the club.

Sale
In November 2018, Arminia Bielefeld announced the sale of the stadium to "3BO GmbH" and "STBO GmbH" (each 50 percent) in order to further improve the club's financial situation. Shareholders include Dr. August Oetker KG and Gauselmann AG. However, the club will retain all rights such as rental incomes and naming rights.

Transport
The stadium is well serviced by public transport.  The Bielefeld Hauptbahnhof is only a few minutes away using line 4 (The red line) of the Bielefeld Stadtbahn tramway. Stadium parking is provided at Bielefeld University.

Video games
Schüco Arena is included in the video game Pro Evolution Soccer 2008, due to lack of licensing rights appearing as "Blautraum Arena".

References

External links
Collection of historical staidium photos at the Arminia Bielefeld website 
World Stadium guide to Bielefelder Alm
Bielefelder Alm at Football Temple

Football venues in Germany
Buildings and structures in Bielefeld
Sports venues in North Rhine-Westphalia
Sports venues completed in 1926
Arminia Bielefeld